Craigellachie Bridge is a cast iron arch bridge across the River Spey at Craigellachie, near to the village of Aberlour in Moray, Scotland. It was designed by the renowned civil engineer Thomas Telford and built from 1812 to 1814. It is a Category A listed structure.

Construction

The ironwork was cast at the Plas Kynaston iron foundry at Cefn Mawr, near Ruabon in Denbighshire by William Hazledine, who cast a number of Telford bridges. The ironwork was transported from the foundry through the Ellesmere Canal and Pontcysyllte Aqueduct then by sea to Speymouth, where it was loaded onto wagons and taken to the site. Testing in the 1960s revealed that the cast-iron had an unusually high tensile strength. This was probably specified by Telford because, unlike in traditional masonry arch bridges, some sections of the arch are not in compression under loading.

History
The bridge was in regular use until 1963, when it was closed for a major refurbishment. A plaque records the completion of this work in 1964.
The side railings and spandrel members were replaced with new ironwork fabricated to match the originals. A 14 ton restriction was placed on the bridge at this point. This, along with the fact that the road to the north of the bridge takes a sharp right-angled turn to avoid a rock face, made it unsuitable for modern vehicles. Despite this, it carried foot and vehicle traffic across the River Spey until 1972, when its function was replaced by a reinforced concrete beam bridge built by Sir William Arrol & Co. which opened in 1970 and carries the A941 road today. Telford's bridge remains in good condition, and is still open to pedestrians and cyclists. The bridge has been given Category A listed status by Historic Scotland and has been designated a civil engineering landmark by the Institution of Civil Engineers and American Society of Civil Engineers.

In 1994, it hosted a parade upon the amalgamation of The Gordon Highlanders and The Queen's Own Highlanders (Seaforth and Camerons) to form The Highlanders (Seaforth, Gordons and Camerons). A plaque has been fitted to the bridge parapet to commemorate this.

Moray Council maintain the bridge, but it is not known who owns it. In November 2017 efforts were started to discover the owner.

Usage in media
The bridge inspired Scottish composer William Marshall to write the popular Strathspey dance in 1814.

The bridge was commemorated on a Royal Mail postage stamp in 2015.

It also features in the artwork and logos of Spey Valley Brewery who brew an 1814 lager in commemoration of the bridge.

References

Bibliography

External links
 Detail on the bridge - Scottish Historical Register
 Musical notation for the Craigellachie Bridge Strathspey Reel
 

Deck arch bridges
Bridges completed in 1814
Category A listed buildings in Moray
Listed bridges in Scotland
Scheduled monuments in Scotland
Bridges by Thomas Telford
Road bridges in Scotland
Historic Civil Engineering Landmarks
Cast-iron arch bridges in Scotland